The Ministry of Agriculture, Animal Industry and Fisheries (MAAIF) is a cabinet-level ministry of the government of Uganda. The mandate of the ministry is to "formulate, review and implement national policies, plans, strategies, regulations and standards and enforce laws, regulations and standards along the value chain of crops, livestock and fisheries". The ministry is also responsible for the "enhancement of crop production and productivity, in a sustainable and environmentally safe manner, for improved food and nutrition security, employment, widened export base and improved incomes of the farmers".

The ministry is headed by a cabinet minister appointed by the president. Frank Tumwebaze is the Minister of Agriculture, Animal Industry and Fisheries.

Location
The headquarters of MAAIF are located at Berkerly Lane in the city of Entebbe on the shores of Lake Victoria. The coordinate of the ministry headquarters are 0°03'27.0"N,  32°28'36.0"E (Latitude:0.057500; Longitude:32.476667).

Departments
The ministry is organised into the following departments.

 Agricultural Planning
 Animal Production & Marketing 
 Entomology
 Crop Production & Marketing
 Crop Inspection and Certification
 Crop Protection 
 Farm Development
 Finance & Administration
 Fisheries Resources and Development 
 Fisheries Regulation Control and Quality Assurance
 Aquacultuer Management and Development. 
 Livestock Health & Entomology

Affiliated agencies
In the execution of its mandate, the ministry collaborates closely with the following semi-autonomous government agencies:

 Control of Trypanosomiasis in Uganda
 Cotton Development Organisation
 Dairy Development Authority
 National Agricultural Advisory Services
 National Agricultural Research Organisation
 National Genetic Resource Centre and Databank
 Plan For Modernisation of Agriculture Secretariat
 Uganda Coffee Development Authority

List of ministers
 Frank Tumwebaze (8 June 2021 - present)
 Vincent Ssempijja (6 June 2016 - 8 June 2021)
 Tress Bucyanayandi (27 May 2011 - 6 June 2016)
 Hope Mwesigye (16 February 2009 - 27 May 2011)
 Hillary Onek (1 June 2006 - 16 February 2009)
 Janat Mukwaya (12 January 2005 - 1 June 2006)
 Wilberforce Kisamba Mugerwa (c. 1999 - 2004)

See also
 Parliament of Uganda
 Agriculture in Uganda

References

External links
Webpage of the Uganda Ministry of Agriculture, Animal Industry and Fisheries

Agricultural organisations based in Uganda
Government ministries of Uganda
Uganda
Uganda
Natural resources in Africa